Fiona Johnson (born 12 April 1983), also known by her married name Fiona Crawley, is an Australian field hockey player.

Johnson was selected to represent Australia in the Beijing Olympic Games of 2008. She injured her left hamstring during a warm-up match versus China and therefore did not participate in the Games.

Johnson took part in the 2010 Commonwealth Games and was part of the team that won the gold medal.

She now takes part in ultramarathon competitions.

References

External links
 

1983 births
Living people
Australian female field hockey players
Commonwealth Games medallists in field hockey
Commonwealth Games gold medallists for Australia
Field hockey players at the 2010 Commonwealth Games
21st-century Australian women
Medallists at the 2010 Commonwealth Games